The Apprentice 5 can refer to:

The Apprentice (UK Series Five)
The Apprentice (US Season 5)